Svenn Erik Medhus (born 22 June 1982) is a Norwegian handball player.

He made his debut on the Norwegian national team in 2007, and played 81 matches for the national team between 2007 and 2012. He competed at the 2009 World Men's Handball Championship in Croatia.

References

1982 births
Living people
Norwegian male handball players